HD 167965 is a single star in the northern constellation of Lyra. It is dimly visible to the naked eye on a sufficiently dark night, having an apparent visual magnitude of 5.56. The star is located at a distance of approximately 590 light years from the Sun based on parallax.

The stellar classification of HD 167965 is B7IV, matching a late B-type star that may have left the main sequence. It is spinning rapidly with a projected rotational velocity of 187 km/s. The star has four times the mass and radius of the Sun, and is radiating 381 times the luminosity of the Sun from its photosphere at an effective temperature of 13,100 K.

In 1925, Otto Struve included this star in a list of newly-discovered spectroscopic binaries, although that is no longer held to be the case.

References

B-type subgiants
Lyra (constellation)
Durchmusterung objects
167965
089482
6845